This is a list of bank robberies, bank robbers and gangs involved in bank robberies.

Australia
Robbers
 Brenden Abbott
 Christopher "Badness" Binse
 Darcy Dugan
 Keith Faure
 Frank Gardiner–Ben Hall gang
 Edward "Ned" Kelly
 Victor Peirce, member of the Pettingill family.
 Gregory David Roberts
 Ronald Ryan
 Andrew George Scott (Captain Moonlite)
 Squizzy Taylor
Robberies
 Bank of Australia robbery, 1828, £14,000 in promissory notes and coins.
 1984 Sydney bank robbery and hostage crisis
 Great Bookie robbery
 Nelson robbery
 Perth Mint Swindle

Austria
 Johann Kastenberger

Canada
Robbers
 Edwin Alonzo Boyd
 Ty Conn
 Roger Caron
 Ivan Grose
 John Hamilton
 Ken Leishman
 Paddy Mitchell
 Kevin Pinto
 Monica Proietti
 Stephen Reid
 Norman Ryan
 Jeffrey Shuman
 Garrett Brock Trapnell
 Front de libération du Québec

Robberies
 Havelock Bank Robbery (1961)
 Saanich shootout (2022)

Denmark
The first bank robbery in Denmark occurred August 18, 1913 in the bank Sparekassen for København og Omegn at Østerbro in Copenhagen. It was carried out by two men, Danish salesman Lindorff Larsen and a German machinist Güttig, armed with revolvers; the two got away with 9000 Danish kroner. Güttig was arrested August 30 and Lindorff Larsen committed suicide after having fled the police.

Finland
 1906 Helsinki bank robbery

France
Robbers
 The Bonnot gang (La Bande à Bonnot)
 Jacques Mesrine
 Albert Spaggiari

Robberies
 Bank of France, 1986, Saint-Nazaire, $11.4 million.
 Bank of France, 1992, Toulon, 160 million francs (£30 million).
 Caisse d'Espargne bank, 1980, Paris, $11.5 million.
 Société Générale S.A, 1976

Georgia
 1907 Tiflis bank robbery
 Jaba Ioseliani

Germany
 Red Army Faction
 Andreas Baader
 Gladbeck hostage crisis after a DM 300,000 bank robbery by Dieter Degowski and Hans-Jürgen Rösner on August 16, 1988

Hungary
Robbers
 Attila Ambrus

India
In 1987, Labh Singh (Sukhdev Singh Sukha) allegedly masterminded what was at that time the largest bank robbery in Indian history, netting almost 60 million (58 million rupees-US$4.5 million) from Millar Ganj branch of Punjab National Bank, Ludhiana; a part of this stolen money belonged to the Reserve Bank of India, India's central bank. It was documented as “Biggest Bank Robbery” under “Curiosities and wonders” in Limca Book of Records. </ref> and AK-47 rifles. 

The Chicago Sun-Times reported that "12 to 15 Sikhs dressed as policemen and armed with submachine guns and rifles escaped with nearly $4.5 million in the biggest bank robbery in Indian history." "No one was injured." A Police spokesman described it as "a neat and clean operation".

Khalistan Commando Force members who allegedly participated in the robbery included Harjinder Singh Jinda, Mathra Singh, Paramjit Singh Panjwar, Satnam Singh Bawa, Gurnam Singh Bundala, Sukhdev Singh Sukha, Daljit Singh Bittu, Gursharan Singh Gamma and Pritpal Singh.

Israel
 Ronnie Leibowitz

Japan
Robbers
 Sadamichi Hirasawa (controversial conviction in bank robbery that killed 12 people by poisoning)

Robberies
 540 million yen robbery incident in Fukutoku Bank Kobe branch, August 1994.
 600 million yen robbery incident in Tachikawa, Tokyo, May 2011.

Lebanon
 The British Bank of the Middle East in January 1976 in Beirut, £25 million, the equivalent of £100 million today. This bank robbery was executed by the PLO.

Malta
 HSBC, 2007, 1 million euros.

Netherlands
Robbers
 Hans Gruyters

Nigeria
 Lawrence Anini
 Ishola Oyenusi

Norway
 NOKAS robbery - The biggest bank robbery in Norwegian history

Pakistan
 ABL Karachi, December 13, 2009,  311 million rupees was looted from the Allied Bank Limited (ABL)’s head office.

Poland
 Wołów bank robbery - the largest bank robbery in Polish history.
 Operation Góral

Portugal
 Espírito Santo Bank of Campolide robbery - most mediated bank robbery in Portuguese history

Republic of Ireland
Robbers
 Martin Cahill
 Gerry Hutch
 Kenneth Littlejohn

Robberies
 Bank of Ireland robbery

Romania
 Ioanid Gang

Russia
 Grigory Kotovsky

Slovenia
On the night of October 31, 2005, robbers entered the safety deposit boxes of SKB Bank (Societe Generale) in Ljubljana through the main door and deactivated the alarm system. Robbers disarmed the security guard and opened more than 400 safety deposit boxes. They took at least €32 million euros in gold, precious stones and cash.

In March 2012 two robbers were arrested. One of them was a security guard at the bank. The court process against two robbers started in November 2013. At least one robber is still free.

Serbia
 Željko Ražnatović
 Pink Panthers

Sweden
Robbers
 Clark Olofsson
 Jackie Arklöv
 Jan-Erik Olsson
 John Ausonius – The Laser Man killer and convicted bank robber.

Robberies
 The Norrmalmstorg Robbery
 Västberga helicopter robbery

United Kingdom
Robbers
 Ronald Biggs
 Ronald Christopher "Buster" Edwards
 Brian Arthur Field
 Lee Murray
 Frankie Fraser
 Bruce Richard Reynolds
 Charles Frederick Wilson
 
Robberies

 Linwood bank robbery, 1969; two policemen killed.
 Bank of America robbery, 1975, Mayfair; London. £8 million stolen, £500,000 recovered.
 Midland Bank Clearing Centre, 1995, Salford, Greater Manchester, £6.6 million.
 Northern Bank robbery, 2004, Belfast, Northern Ireland; £26 million.

United States

Robbers 

Edward J. Adams
 Aryan Republican Army
 Michael William Brescia
 John Ashley
 Earl Edwin Austin
 Jorge Ayala
 Harvey Bailey
 Arthur Barker
 Albert Bates
 Clyde Barrow, of Bonnie and Clyde
 Eddie Bentz
 Earl Best
 Naomi Betts
 Tyler Bingham
 George Birdwell
 Black Liberation Army
 Stanley Ray Bond
 Fred William Bowerman
 Christopher John Boyce
 Ford Bradshaw
 Al Brady
 Robert Brady
 Everett Bridgewater
 Joseph Brodak
 Henry Newton Brown
 Harry Brunette
 James J. Bulger
 Edward Bunker
 Fred Burke
 Donald Richard Bussmeyer
 Tommy Carroll
 Butch Cassidy, leader of the Hole in the Wall Gang
 John Paul Chase
 James Clark
 Jim Clark
 Russell Clark
 Archie Clement
 Theodore Cole and Ralph Roe
 Bernard Coy
 Joseph Paul Cretzer, formed the Cretzer-Kyle Gang
 Patrick Critton
 Pat Crowe
 William Daddano Sr.
 Emmett Dalton, principal of the Dalton Gang, 1890s
 Ed Davis
 Lawrence DeVol
 Bennie and Stella Dickson
 The Covenant, The Sword, and the Arm of the Lord
 John Dillinger
 Bill Doolin, 1890s
 Frederick Grant Dunn
 Earl Durand
 Egan's Rats
 Aussie Elliott
 Jeffrey and Jill Erickson 
 Gilbert James Everett
 The Flathead gang
 Fleagle Gang
 Joseph Paul Franklin
 Rufus Franklin
 John Franzese
 Ralph Fults
 Charles Arthur "Pretty Boy" Floyd
 Geezer bandit
 George Jackson Brigade
 Russell Gibson
 Fred Goetz
 Eddie Green
 Carl Gugasian
 Granddad Bandit
 John Hamilton
 Clarence Hill
 Holden-Keating Gang
 Anthony Hathaway, "Cyborg Bandit" and "Elephant Man Bandit"
 Shon Hopwood
 Cora Hubbard
 J.L. Hunter
 Hunt-Gant Gang
 Phillip Hutchinson
 James-Younger Gang, 1866–1881
 Elmer H. Inman
 David Stanley Jacubanis
 Frank James, one of the two James Brothers
 Jesse James, the other member of the James Brothers pair
 Christopher Jeburk
 Charles E. Johnson
 Morris Johnson
 W. D. Jones
 Anthony Michael Juliano
 Alvin Karpis
 Tom Ketchum
 Machine Gun Kelly
 John Allen Kendrick
 Israel Keyes
 Ben Kilpatrick
 Herman Lamm
 Elzy Lay
 George Leonidas Leslie
 Robert Van Lewing
 Loan Ranger Bandit
 Harvey Logan
 Harry Longabaugh, known as "The Sundance Kid"
 James C. Lucas
 David Mack
 Carlos Marcello
 Christopher Magee
 Charles Makley
 Candice Rose Martinez, "The Cell Phone Bandit"
 Emil Mătăsăreanu & Larry Eugene Phillips, Jr., North Hollywood shootout
 William Matix & Michael Platt, 1986 FBI Miami shootout
 Mad Hatter (bank robber), 2006–2007
 May 19th Communist Organization
 McCanles gang, 1861
 Ben Golden McCollum
 Henry Methvin
 Midwest Bank Robbers, 1990s
 Vernon Miller
 William Miller
 Barry Mills
 Bugs Moran
 Joe "Pegleg" Morgan
 Frank Nash
 Salvatore Naturale
 Jay Wesley Neill
 George "Baby Face" Nelson
 Newton Gang
 Earl Northern
 Albert Frederick Nussbaum
 Joseph "Specs" O'Keefe
 The Order
David Lane
Robert Jay Matthews
 Bonnie Parker, of Bonnie and Clyde
 Burton Phillips
 Harry Pierpont
 The Piggy Bank Bandit - Identity still unknown (2021 Robber)
 Duane Earl Pope
 Katherine Ann Power
 Phineas Priesthood
 Gerhard Puff
 Reno Gang
 Kenneth "Speedy" Raulerson
 David "Chippy" Robinson
 Leslie Ibsen Rogge robbed a total of $2,000,000
 Verne Sankey
 Frank Sawyer
 Susan Edith Saxe
 John Paul Scott
 Scott "Hollywood" Scurlock
 Mutulu Shakur
 Ted Skeer
 Tommy Silverstein
 Edward Smith
 Luke Elliott Sommer
 Henry Starr
 Steady B
 The Stopwatch Gang
 Willie "The Actor" Sutton
 Symbionese Liberation Army
Patty Hearst
Donald DeFreeze
James Kilgore
Emily Harris
 Sara Jane Olson
 Too Tall Bandit, identity unknown
 Robert Toye
 Forrest Tucker
 Wilbur Underhill, Jr.
 United Freedom Front
 Homer Van Meter
 Clayton Waagner
 Donald Eugene Webb
 Wheaton Bandit
 Whittemore Gang
 Bobby Randell Wilcoxson
 Johnny Madison Williams Jr.
 John Wojtowicz
  The Wonderland Gang
 Adam Worth
 Jerry Lynn Young
 Cole Younger

Deadly US robberies 

 Security Pacific Bank, Norco, California, 1980, deadly shootout between local law enforcement and five bank robbers
 Geronimo bank robbery in Geronimo, Oklahoma, 1984, resulted in the deaths of three bank employees and one customer
 1986 FBI Miami shootout, deadly shootout between FBI and two bank robbers
 North Hollywood shootout, 1997, deadly shootout between local law enforcement and two bank robbers
 PNC Bank, Erie, Pennsylvania, 2003, robbery by pizza delivery man Brian Douglas Wells wearing a neck collar bomb

Large-value US robberies

 Manhattan Savings Institution, 1878, $2.5 million ($ million in ) including $12,000 in cash, with the rest in securities. Masterminded by George Leonidas Leslie and carried out by Jimmy Hope, Samuel Perris and others.
 United California Bank robbery, 1972, $9 million ($ million in ) in cash and valuables (the current U.S. value record)
 Lincoln National Bank robbery, Lincoln, Nebraska, 1930, $2.7 million ($ million in ) in cash and securities.
First National Bank of Arizona, Tucson, 1981, $3.3 million ($ million in ) in cash.
 Seafirst Bank, Lakewood, Washington, February 1997, $4.5 million ($ million in ) in cash.
 1998 Bank of America robbery, 1998, $1.6 million ($ million in )

Uruguay
 Tupamaros

References